The 1969 East Texas State Lions football team represented East Texas State University in the 1969 NAIA football season. They were led by head coach Ernest Hawkins, who was in his sixth season at East Texas State. The Lions played their home games at Memorial Stadium and were members of the Lone Star Conference. The Lions shared the Lone Star Conference championship with Texas A&I, the eventual national champion.

Schedule

Awards

All-Americans
Arthur James, First Team, Tailback 
Jack Herrington, Offensive Tackle  
Don Hynds, Defensive End

All-Lone Star Conference

LSC Superlatives
Coach of the Year: Ernest Hawkins

LSC First Team
George Daskalakes, Wide Receiver
Jack Herrington, Offensive Tackle
Don Hynds, Defensive End
Arthur James, Tailback
Dub Lewis, Center

LSC Second Team
Bill Allison, Fullback
Grady Ivy, Center/Linebacker
Mike Kingcaid, Defensive Tackle
Dwight White, Defensive Tackle

LSC Honorable Mention
Jim Dietz, Quarterback

References

East Texas State
Texas A&M–Commerce Lions football seasons
Lone Star Conference football champion seasons
East Texas State Lions football